Taeoch'ŏn station is a railway station in Taeosich'ŏl-lodongjagu, Unhŭng county, Ryanggang province, North Korea, on the Paektusan Ch'ŏngnyŏn Line of the Korean State Railway; it is also the starting point of the Osich'ŏn Line to Osich'ŏn.

History
The station, along with the rest of the Pongduri–Hyesanjin section of the Kilhye Line, was opened by the Chosen Government Railway on 1 November 1937.

On 9 October 2006 an underground nuclear test was conducted at P'unggye-ri in Kilju County, causing the closure of the line for 3-4 months.

References

Railway stations in North Korea